Çakırtaş can refer to the following places in Turkey:

 Çakırtaş, Kemaliye
 Çakırtaş, Iğdır
 Çakırtaş, Pasinler
 Çakırtaş, Vezirköprü